Deep Cuts is a compilation album by the Canadian hard rock band Helix.  It is their 12th official release, and their third compilation album.  It collects music from both their early indi career as well as their catalogue with Capitol Records and rare tracks.

Track listing
All songs written by Brian Vollmer and Paul Hackman except where noted.

 "Heavy Metal Love"
 "Don't Get Mad Get Even" (Dal Bello, Thorney)
 "Rock You" (Bob Halligan Jr.)
 "When The Hammer Falls"
 "Gimme Gimme Good Lovin'" (Ritchie Cordell, Joey Levine)
 "It's Too Late" (Hackman, Dexter) (from the soundtrack to Iron Eagle)
 "Deep Cuts The Knife" (Halligan, Hackman)
 "The Kids Are All Shakin'"(Video Mix)
 "Wild In The Streets" (Ray Lyell, Hackman)
 "Dream On" (Dan McCafferty, Billy Rankin, Darrell Sweet, Lee Agnew, Manny Charlton, John Locke)
 "Women, Whiskey & Sin" (Voller, Hackman, Brent Doerner)
 "Everybody Pays The Price"
 "Give It To You"
 "Good To The Last Drop" (Vollmer, Marc Ribler)

Credits

Personnel
Brian Vollmer - Vocals
Greg "Fritz" Hinz - Drums except on 11
Daryl Gray - Bass except on 1, 2, and 11
Paul Hackman - Guitars
Brent "The Doctor" Doerner - Guitars except on 13 and 14
Mike Uzelec - Bass on 1, 2, and 11
Leo Niebudek - Drums on 11

Production
Compilation produced by David Richman and Kevin Flaherty

References 

Helix (band) albums
1999 greatest hits albums